Open access scholarly communication of Greece is preserved in repositories maintained by several academic institutions.

Repositories 
There are a number of collections of scholarship in Greece housed in digital open access repositories. They contain journal articles, book chapters, data, and other research outputs that are free to read. As of March 2018, the UK-based Directory of Open Access Repositories lists some 36 repositories in Greece. The National Hellenic Research Foundation, University of Patras, and University of Piraeus hold the most digital assets.

Timeline

Key events in the development of open access in Greece include the following:
 2018
 June: Hellenic Academic Libraries Link (HEAL-Link) issues a declaration supporting open access.

References

Further reading

External links
 
 
 . ("The purpose of the 'Kallipos' action is the production and delivery of Open Access electronic books, which will be used by the students of Greek universities")
 
 
 

Academia in Greece
Communications in Greece
Greece
Science and technology in Greece